Boomerang (also titled Boomrang in French speaking countries) is an album by Daara J. It was released in 2003 on Wrasse Records. It features musicians such as Rokia Traore, China, Sergeant García, and Desiz LaPeste.

Track listing

 "Boomrang" (Sagma, Sagna, Seck, Seck, Traore) - 4:18
 "Esperanza" (Garcia, Sagna, Seck, Seck) - 3:57
 "Exodus" (Adour, Sagna, Seck, Seck) - 4:02
 "Bopp Sa Bopp" (Sagna, Seck, Seck) - 3:59
 "Le Cycle" featuring Rokia Traore (Sagna, Seck, Seck, Taoré) - 4:57
 "Le Precipice" (Sagna, Seck, Seck) - 4:18
 "Paris Dakar" featuring Disiz La Peste (LaPeste, Sagna, Seck, Seck) - 4:43
 "Hip Hop Civilization" featuring China (Moses, Sagna, Seck, Seck) - 3:56
 "Number One" (Bacjelet, Faye, Sagna, Seck) - 4:00
 "Si La Vie N'est Pas Belle" (Sagna, Seck, Seck) - 3:21
 "Babylone" (Sagna, Seck, Seck) - 3:31
 "Magg Dan" (Sagna, Seck, Seck, Soudin) - 4:48
 "Esperanza" featuring Sergeant Garcia (Garcia, Sagma, Sagna, Seck, Seck) - 6:24

Personnel 

 Aladji Man – Vocals
 David Aubaile – Flute
 Yona Azoulay – Art Direction
 Quentin Bachelet – Arranger, Programming, Producer, Brass
 Balbino – Guitar, Vocals, Choir, Chorus
 Marc Berthoumieux – Accordion
 Vincent Chavagnac – Saxophone
 China – Vocals
 Daara J – Arranger, Programming, Producer
 Disiz la Peste – Vocals
 Faada Freddy – Vocals
 Adamson Faye – Arranger, Programming, Producer
 Christian Fourquet – Trombone
 Sergent Garcia – Arranger, Programming, Vocals, Producer
 Hector Gomez Guilbeaux – Vocals, Choir, Chorus
 Patrice Kung – Mixing
 Youri Lenquette – Photography
 Frank Loriou – Graphic Design
 Anthony Marciano – Art Direction
 Ivan Darroman Montoya – Percussion
 Eric Mula – Trumpet, Arranger
 Eric Mulat – Trumpet
 Jean François Oricelli – Guitar
 Papa Jubee – Arranger, Programming, Producer, Engineer
 Patson – Engineer
 Juan Carlos Petit – Bass
 Paul Scemama – Mixing
 Toma Sidibe – Percussion
 Laurent Vernerey – Bass
 Christophe Appel - sound/live

Daara J albums
2003 albums
Wrasse Records albums